James R. "Josh" Devoe (March 24, 1888 – March 19, 1979) was a Negro leagues catcher and manager for several years before the founding of the first Negro National League, and in its first few seasons.

A Cleveland newspaper reporter in 1920 claimed Rube Foster said of Devoe he was "one of the smartest young players he ever trained."

Post career
Devoe died in Los Angeles, California in 1979 at the age of 90.

References

External links

Negro league baseball managers
Chicago American Giants players
Cleveland Tate Stars players
1888 births
1979 deaths
20th-century African-American people